Edanganni is a village in the Udayarpalayam taluk of Ariyalur district, Tamil Nadu, India.

Demographics 

As per the 2001 census, Edanganni had a total population of 2627 with 1371 males and 1256 females.

References 

Villages in Ariyalur district